Philippe Aubert (born 5 October 1957 in Aulnay-sous-Bois) is a retired French athlete who specialised in the sprint hurdles. He is best known for winning the gold medal in the 110 metres hurdles at the inaugural 1989 Jeux de la Francophonie in Casablanca. In addition, he represented his country at four European Indoor Championships.

His personal bests are 13.68 seconds in the 110 metres hurdles (+0.4 m/s, Tours 1988) and 7.76 seconds in the 60 metres hurdles (Liévin 1987).

International competitions

References

1957 births
Living people
French male hurdlers
Sportspeople from Seine-Saint-Denis
20th-century French people
21st-century French people